Joshua "Josh" Slack (born 16 December 1976) is a male beach volleyball player from Australia.

He represented Australia at the 2000 Summer Olympics with teammate Matthew Grinlaubs. Slack and teammate Andrew Schacht represented Australia at the 2004 Summer Olympics, and the 2008 Summer Olympics.

Early years 
Slack took up beach volleyball in 1998 to get fit for soccer. He joined the world tour in 1999 and competed at his first Olympic Games in 2000 where he placed 17th. In 2002 he convinced Andrew Schacht to come out of retirement and the pair won bronze at the 2003 World Tour in Portugal. The two of them then won a national title, a top 10 international ranking and 2004 Olympic Team selection.

An eleven-year pro on the Australian Beach Volleyball (ABV) circuit, "Jumpin'” Josh Slack has collected more than 10 ABV Tour event and Australian Championships titles. In 2006–07, he outshone his peers on his way to winning the ABV Tour MVP. A three-time Olympian, he's also collected medals in international competitions such as the Canadian FIVB Tour and the World Championships.

Achievements 
Slack joined the world tour in 1999 and competed at his first Olympic Games in 2000. He was placed 17th. In 2002 he teamed up with Andrew Schacht (who came out of retirement) and the pair won bronze at the 2003 World Tour in Portugal. They then went on to win a national title, a top 10 international ranking and 2004 Olympic Team selection. Slack and Schacht finished 9th in the 2004 Athens Olympics and again finished ninth at the 2008 Beijing Olympics. 

In 2007 Slack and Shacht won a bronze medal at the FIVB World Championships. This was the highest ever performance by any Australian men's volleyball team at the time.

References 
Sources
 
 

Citations

1976 births
Living people
Australian men's beach volleyball players
Beach volleyball players at the 2000 Summer Olympics
Beach volleyball players at the 2004 Summer Olympics
Beach volleyball players at the 2008 Summer Olympics
Olympic beach volleyball players of Australia
Sportspeople from Brisbane